Historical recording may refer to:

 Grammy Award for Best Historical Album, historical reissue of pop albums
 Historical classical music recordings